Rutherglen High School is a non-denominational, co-educational secondary school in Cambuslang, South Lanarkshire, Scotland, for pupils with additional support needs.

The school was established in August 1999 and has shared a campus with Cathkin High School in the neighbourhood of Whitlawburn since the opening of new buildings in October 2008; prior to this, it occupied the vacated annexe of Stonelaw High School (originally Gallowflat School) in central Rutherglen, about  further north, with the relocation met with opposition by some parents and board members due to the anticipated disruption to the pupils' routines. A nursing home now occupies the Rutherglen site.

References

Secondary schools in South Lanarkshire
Buildings and structures in Cambuslang
Rutherglen
Educational institutions established in 1999
1999 establishments in Scotland
Special schools in Scotland
Buildings and structures demolished in 2009
School buildings completed in 2008